Local Boy Makes Good is a 1931 American Pre-Code comedy film directed by Mervyn LeRoy and written by Robert Lord, Raymond Griffith and Ray Enright. The film stars Joe E. Brown, Dorothy Lee, Ruth Hall, Edward Woods, Edward Nugent and Wade Boteler. The film was released by Warner Bros. on November 27, 1931.

Plot
Sheepish bookstore employee John Miller has become infatuated with a college girl, Julia Winters, he has never met. His love letters to her are accidentally mailed, so Julia comes to visit, under the mistaken impression John is a college track star.

While co-worker Marjorie helps continue his deception, John tries to join the school's team. His wild javelin throw nearly kills other athletes, who chase him off the field. The college's coach is amazed at how fast John can run.

Julia figures out she's been had. A psychology student, she analyzes John as a boy with an inferiority complex. After the coach finds John and invites him to run, Julia persuades him to race against her old boyfriend, Spike Hoyt, a star athlete and a bully. Majorie eventually talks John into it, even getting him drunk enough to do it.

Cast    
Joe E. Brown as John Augustus Miller
Dorothy Lee as Julia Winters
Ruth Hall as Marjorie Blake
Edward Woods as Spike Hoyt
Edward Nugent as Wally Pierce
Wade Boteler as Doc
John Harrington as Coach Jackson
William Burress as Colonel Small

Box office
According to Warner Bros records the film earned $500,000 domestically and $143,000 foreign.

Preservation status
 A print is housed in the Library of Congress collection.

References

External links 
 
 

1931 films
1930s English-language films
Warner Bros. films
American comedy films
1931 comedy films
Films directed by Mervyn LeRoy
American black-and-white films
Films set in universities and colleges
1930s American films